Oakwood Park may refer to:

Oakwood Park, Enfield, a park located in Oakwood, London, United Kingdom
Oakwood Park, Indiana
Oakwood Park, Missouri
Oakwood Theme Park, Pembrokeshire
Flitch Green, Essex, England (formerly known as Oakwood Park)